The 1906 international cricket season was from April 1906 to September 1906.

Season overview

July

West Indies in England

West Indies in Scotland

August

Gentlemen of Holland in England

References

International cricket competitions by season
1906 in cricket